Thomas Wilkinson, VC (1831 – 22 September 1887) was a British soldier and a recipient of the Victoria Cross, the highest award for gallantry in the face of the enemy that can be awarded to British and Commonwealth forces.

Military career
Wilkinson was about 24 years old, and a bombardier in the Royal Marine Artillery, Royal Marines, during the Crimean War when the following deed took place for which he was awarded the Victoria Cross (VC).

On 7 June 1855 at Sebastopol, Crimea, Bombardier Wilkinson was especially recommended for gallant conduct with the advanced batteries. He worked at the task of placing sandbags to repair damage done to the defences under a most galling fire.

Wilkinson later achieved the rank of sergeant instructor. His Victoria Cross is displayed at the Royal Marines Museum, Southsea, England.

References

External links
Location of grave and VC medal (North Yorkshire)

1831 births
1887 deaths
Military personnel from York
Royal Marines ranks
British recipients of the Victoria Cross
Crimean War recipients of the Victoria Cross
Royal Navy personnel of the Crimean War
Royal Navy recipients of the Victoria Cross
Chevaliers of the Légion d'honneur